There are at least two rivers named the Hillsborough River:

Hillsborough River (Florida), which flows through Tampa
Hillsborough River (Prince Edward Island), which flows through Charlottetown